"Posthumus Zone" and "Granicus" are songs composed by the now-disbanded Los Angeles electronic music group E.S. Posthumus for the TV programs The NFL on CBS and The NFL Today on CBS Sports. The songs are played at the start and end of the programs, before and after commercial breaks, and during stoppages of play of games shown on the NFL on CBS, and on commercial spots that announce the programming schedule, as a jingle for viewers to remember. The theme was first used for the NFL on CBS in 2003.

The songs were also used to introduce, to conclude, and to segue to commercials on Westwood One's NFL game coverage and halftime programming. It has since been replaced with a new score commissioned by Westwood One since 2013.

"Posthumus Zone", which is just under a minute long, was released by E.S. Posthumus in January 2008 as a single on the iTunes Store and on Amazon MP3. In 2005, E.S. Posthumus also released the single "Rise to Glory," a remix of "Posthumus Zone" in association with DJ Quik with vocals from Bizarre.

Since 2016, the theme is used on The Price Is Right on the Friday episode before the Super Bowl in years CBS has the game.  This was used in 50 and LIII.

References 
CBS Sports - CBS.SportsLine.com "Los Angeles-Based Band "ES Posthumus" Composes and Records New Harder Hitting Sound to Accompany Network's New Graphics, Openings, Teases, Bumpers and Billboards"
ES Posthumus

External links 
 

2003 songs
E.S. Posthumus songs
Sports television theme songs
CBS Sports
National Football League music